The 2016 Swedish Golf Tour, titled as the 2016 Nordea Tour for sponsorship reasons, was the 33rd season of the Swedish Golf Tour.

Most of the tournaments also featured on the 2016 Nordic Golf League.

Schedule
The following table lists official events during the 2016 season.

Order of Merit
The Order of Merit was titled as the Nordea Tour Ranking and was based on prize money won during the season, calculated using a points-based system.

See also
2016 Danish Golf Tour
2016 Swedish Golf Tour (women)

Notes

References

Swedish Golf Tour
Swedish Golf Tour